Françoise Thinat (born in 1934) in Gien (Loiret), is a French classical pianist.

She presides over the Orléans International Piano Competition, which she founded in 1994 and teaches at the École normale de musique de Paris.

Biography 
First prize in interpretation in the classes of Yvonne Lefébure and Germaine Mounier at the Conservatoire de Paris, Thinat has also taken interpretation courses from Marguerite Long, Georges Tzipine, Louis Fourestier and Guido Agosti at Siena. She has performed in concerts in Europe, the United States, Canada, Japan and Korea, and has given interpretation courses abroad.

Thinat is the founder of the Orléans International Piano Competition in 1994. This internationally renowned biennial competition showcases the piano heritage from the 20th century to the present day. Supported by many patronages and cultural associations, this competition has revealed young artists. For several decades, she has also directed the concert series entitled Matinées de piano and given at the Orléans Institute.

Among her many educational activities, let us quote her participation in the writing of "10 years with the piano" (Cité de la musique); Thinat is also the initiator or the inspiration for several musical events: the Déodat de Séverac piano training course at Saint-Félix-Lauragais, the piano workshop July in Orléans, the cello festival August in Orléans.

Thinat is a member of several national and international juries. She has received the Music Education Award offered by French music publishers and has been appointed Officer of the Ordre des Arts et des Lettres, promotion January 2016.

Recordings 
For the Arion label Thinat has recorded:
 Guy Ropartz: ouverture, variations et final; musique au jardin; nocturne
 Claude Debussy: La mer, Images pour orchestre, gigues, rondes de printemps, with Jacques Bernier
 Paul Dukas: Grande sonate, en mi bémol mineur
 Robert Schumann: Album for the Young
 Edvard Grieg: album La Norvège d'Edvard Grieg.
Other labels:
 Déodat de Séverac: Cerdaña, Les Naïades et le Faune Indiscret (reissued in 2014 at Tessitures - Satine).

Prizes 
Thinat has obtained several prizes:
 First Grand Prize at the Maria Canals International Music Competition in Barcelone
 First Grand Prize of the "Marguerite Long Academy"
 Laureate of the Marguerite Long and Geneva competitions
 Music education prize offered by French music publishers
 Officer of the Ordre des Arts et des Lettres, promotion January 2016

References 

 This article is based on the information contained in Françoise Thinat's record presentation about Guy Ropartz: Ouverture, Variations et Final; Musique au jardin; Nocturne, published by Arion in 1984, which LP was re-released on compact disc in 1991.
 Biographical information after 1991 is taken from the pianist's official website.

External links 
 Françoise Thinat, une vie et une carrière pour l'amour du piano (La République du centre)
 Françoise Thinat on France Musique
 Françoise Thinat, tout pour la musique Radio Classique
 Thinat's discography on Discogs
 Concert rencontre Françoise Thinat et le piano du début du XXe siècle (1 February 2018)
 Françoise Thinat on Symétrie
 Concours d’Orléans : Françoise Thinat tourne la page (La lettre du musicien)
 Françoise Thinat (École normale Cortot) 
 Official website
 Françoise Thinat plays Schumann Album für die Jugend Op. 68 (excerpts) (YouTube)

1934 births
People from Gien
Living people
20th-century French women classical pianists
Conservatoire de Paris alumni
Academic staff of the École Normale de Musique de Paris
Officiers of the Ordre des Arts et des Lettres
21st-century French male classical pianists
Women music educators